A literary cycle is a group of stories focused on common figures, often (though not necessarily) based on mythical figures or loosely on historical ones. Cycles which deal with an entire country are sometimes referred to as matters. A fictional cycle is often referred to as a mythos.

Examples from folk and classical literature 
 The Anansi tales, which center on the Ashanti  of Ghana trickster spider-spirit Anansi, and its variations in the Americas as Ti Malice and Bouki in Haiti, Br'er Rabbit or John and Old Master in the Southern United States.
 The tales of the One Thousand and One Nights, brought together by the frame story of the tale of Scheherazade and Shahryār.
 Nasreddin, (1208-1285) is a character in the folklore of the Muslim world from the Balkans to China, and a hero of humorous short stories and satirical anecdotes.
 The four troubadours Bernart d'Auriac, Pere Salvatge, Roger Bernard III of Foix, and Peter III of Aragon composed a cycle of four sirventes in the summer of 1285 concerning the Aragonese Crusade.
 The Matter of Britain (or the "Arthurian cycle"), which centers on King Arthur and the Knights of the Round Table
 The Vulgate cycle (also known as the Lancelot-Grail)
 The Post-Vulgate cycle
 The Matter of France (or the "Carolingian cycle"), which centers on Charlemagne and the Twelve Peers
 Chanson de Geste
 La Geste de Garin de Monglane
 Doon de Mayence
 Garin le Loherain
 Crusade cycle
 The Henriad, the four plays of Shakespeare centered on Henry V.
 Two examples of Japanese cycles are: the Matter of Japan (Kojiki, Nihon Shoki, etc.) and the Genji-Heike Cycle (The Tale of the Heike, Gikeiki about Minamoto no Yoshitsune, etc.). Also popular are the Soga Brothers and Forty-Seven Ronin cycles.
 The Matter of Rome (or the "cycle of Rome"), which centers on Julius Caesar and Alexander the Great
 The Shahnameh (or “The Book of Kings” ) and the legend of Arash the Archer as well as Avesta that make up most of the Persian Mythology, namely, tales of heroes like Rostam and Esfandyar
 The Mythological Cycle, which centers on the Celtic pantheon
 The Fenian Cycle, which centers on Fionn mac Cumhaill and the Fianna
 The Cycle of the Kings, which centers on the monarchy of Ireland
 The Reynard cycle, which centers on the fabular fox Reynard
 Der Ring des Nibelungen (or the "Ring cycle"), which centers on the Ring and the Norse pantheon
 The voyages of Sinbad the sailor, the hero of a cycle of tales of monsters, magical places, and supernatural phenomena met on his successive voyages.
 The epic cycle centering on the Trojan War
 The Ulster Cycle, which centers on Cú Chulainn and the Kingdom of Ulster

References

Cycles